"Unbreakable" is the debut single by English musician James Cottriall, from his first studio album Sincerely Me. It was released in Austria as a digital download on 9 April 2010. The song was written by James Cottriall and produced by Alexander Kahr. It entered the Austrian Singles Chart at number 47 and peaked at number 16. It also reached number one on the Ö3 Hörercharts (Most Requested Chart for Austria) and remained in the top 40 chart for 20 weeks. The song was featured on the Ö3 Greatest Hits Vol. 50 and AustroPop Forever Vol. 4 compilation albums.

Music video
A music video to accompany the release of "Unbreakable" was first released onto YouTube on 21 June 2010 at a total length of three minutes and eleven seconds. The video shows James with his fictional girlfriend going through an emotional break-up, with a concurrent sub plot of him playing his guitar in an apartment with a broken water pipe gradually flooding the room, leaving him eventually submerged.

Track listing
 Digital download
 "Unbreakable" - 3:12

Credits and personnel
 Lead vocals – James Cottriall
 Producer – Alexander Kahr
 Lyrics – James Cottriall
 Label: James Cottriall

Chart performance

Release history

References

2010 songs
2010 debut singles
James Cottriall songs